Alexander Hoffmann may refer to:

 Alexander Hoffmann (biologist) (fl. 1990s–2010s), German-American biologist
 Alexander Hoffmann (politician) (born 1975), German politician of the Christian Social Union

See also
 Alex Hofmann (born 1980), motorcycle racer